Province of Åland was a province of Finland from 1918 to 2009.

The State Provincial Office on the Åland Islands (Länsstyrelsen på Åland) represented the Finnish central government in Åland between 1918 and 2009. Due to its autonomy, it had somewhat different functions than similar offices in other Provinces of Finland.  Generally a State Provincial Office was a joint regional authority of seven different ministries of the Government of Finland. In Åland, the State Provincial Office also represented a set of other authorities of the central government, which in mainland-Finland has separate bureaucracies. On the other hand, duties, which on mainland-Finland were handled by the provincial offices, were transferred to the autonomous government of Åland.

Along with the abolition of all provinces of Finland, the Åland State Provincial Office was replaced by the State Department of Åland in 2009.

Map

Municipalities in 2009 (cities in bold) 

Brändö
Eckerö
Finström
Föglö
Geta
Hammarland
Jomala
Kumlinge
Kökar
Lemland
Lumparland
Mariehamn
Saltvik
Sottunga
Sund
Vårdö

Governors 
 Hjalmar von Bonsdorff 1918
 William Isaksson 1918–1922
 Lars Wilhelm Fagerlund 1922–1937
 Torsten Rothberg 1938
 Ruben Österberg 1939–1945
 Herman Koroleff 1945–1953
 Tor Brenning 1954–1972
 Martin Isaksson 1972–1982
 Henrik Gustavsson 1982–1999
 Peter Lindbäck 1999–2009

Provinces of Finland (1917–97)
Provinces of Finland (1997–2009)
Åland